Beetown is an unincorporated community in the town of Beetown, Grant County, Wisconsin, United States.

History 
The settlement was first surveyed in 1847 or 1848. The community had become prosperous by 1850, boasting three hotels, but a combination of the Gold Rush and an outbreak of cholera nearly depopulated the community.

Notes

Unincorporated communities in Grant County, Wisconsin
Unincorporated communities in Wisconsin